Cuando Se Va El Amor (English: When love leaves) is a Latin pop song written and performed by Kany García. The song was chosen as the third single from Kany's third album, Kany García. The song was chosen as the third single via Kany's Facebook page.

Charts

Awards/Nominations
||
|-
|rowspan="1"| 2014 ||Kany García||ASCAP Awards Latin Pop Song of the Year ||  ||

References

2012 songs
Songs written by Kany García
Sony BMG singles
Song recordings produced by Julio Reyes Copello